Max Koch (22 December 1855 in Munich – 19 December 1931 in Breslau) was a German historian and literary critic.

Biography
He studied at the University of Munich as a pupil of Michael Bernays, receiving his PhD in 1878. Subsequently, he continued his education in Berlin, London and Paris, and became a docent at the University of Marburg in 1879. He was appointed an assistant professor of literary history at the University of Breslau in 1890, where in 1895 he became a full professor. In 1918 he was named university rector.

Work
 Helferich Peter Sturz : nebst einer Abhandlung über die schleswigischen Literaturbriefe mit Benützung handschriftlicher Quellen (Munich, 1879) – Helfrich Peter Sturz : together with a treatise on Schleswig literature letters, etc..
 Ueber die Beziehungen der englischen Literatur zur deutschen im 18. Jahrhundert (Leipzig, 1883) – On the relationship of English literature for Germans in the 18th century.
 Shakespeares Leben – Shakespeare's life.
 Franz Grillparzer. Eine charakteristik (1891) – On Franz Grillparzer.
 Nationalität und Nationallitteratur (1891) – Nationality and national literature.
 Geschichte der deutschen Literatur von den ältesten Zeiten bis zur Gegenwart (1897, with Friedrich Vogt) – History of German literature from the earliest times to the present.
 Richard Wagner (3 volumes, 1907–18) – Biography of Richard Wagner.

Compilations
 Goethe and Schiller literature for Goedeke's Grundriss
 Shakespeare and Chamisso for Cotta's Bibliothek der Weltliteratur
 Von Arnim, Brentano, Eichendorff, Fouqué, Hoffmann, Schulze, Immermann and Lenau for Joseph Kürschner's Deutsche National Literatur
He founded Zeitschrift für vergleichende Literaturgeschichte (Berlin, 1886, later Weimar).

References

External links

 

1855 births
1931 deaths
German literary critics
20th-century German historians
Academic staff of the University of Breslau
Writers from Munich
German male non-fiction writers
Ludwig Maximilian University of Munich alumni
19th-century German historians